A list of Boston University School of Law notable alumni follows below in alphabetical order.

Notable alumni
 Nathan Abbott, LLB 1881, founding Dean of Stanford Law School
 Sharif Abdullah, founder and president of Commonway Institute and the Common Society Movement
 Charles J. Adams LLB 1951, Vermont Attorney General
 Lincoln C. Almond, JD 1961, Governor of Rhode Island 
 George W. Anderson, LLB 1890, Judge of the U.S. Court of Appeals for the First Circuit.
 Gleason Archer, Sr., LLB 1906, founder of Suffolk University Law School
 Chip Babcock, JD 1976, attorney
 Consuelo Northrup Bailey, LLB 1925, Lieutenant Governor of Vermont, first woman elected as lieutenant governor in the United States
 F. Lee Bailey, LLB 1960, 1966, disbarred criminal defense lawyer; represented O. J. Simpson, among others
 Jennie Loitman Barron, LLB 1913, LLM 1914, first woman appointed associate justice of the Massachusetts Superior Court
 Carolyn Berger, JD 1976, first woman Justice of the Delaware Supreme Court
 Albert Brown, JD, Governor of New Hampshire    
 Fred H. Brown, JD, Governor of New Hampshire, U.S. Congressman 
 Edward W. Brooke, LLB 1948, LLM 1949, Attorney General of Massachusetts; first African American elected to the Senate by popular vote; one of only five African Americans to serve in the US Senate; awarded the Presidential Medal of Freedom. 
 William M. Butler, 1884, U.S. Senator (MA) 
 Don Calloway, JD 2005, Missouri State Representative (2009–Present)
 George Frederick Cameron, 1854–1885, Canadian poet and journalist, best known for writing the libretto for first Canadian operetta Leo, the Royal Cadet
 Arthur P. Carpenter, LLB 1897, US Marshal for Vermont
 Norman S. Case, LLB 1912, Governor of Rhode Island and the Providence Plantations
 Walter H. Cleary, LLB 1915, Chief Justice of the Vermont Supreme Court
 Martha M. Coakley, JD 1979, Massachusetts Attorney General (2007–Present), District Attorney for Middlesex County, Massachusetts
 William S. Cohen, LLB 1965, U.S. Secretary of Defense and US Senator from Maine 
Warren A. Cole - founder of Lambda Chi Alpha, one of the largest social fraternities in the United States
 John F. Collins, 1908, Mayor of Providence, Rhode Island
 Deane C. Davis, LLB 1922, Governor of Vermont, 1969-1973
 Paul A. Dever, JD, Governor of Massachusetts 
 Joshua Eric Dodge, 1877, Wisconsin Supreme Court
 Don Feder, 1972, Jewish American LGBT rights activist and war protester during Vietnam
 Samuel Felker, JD, Governor of New Hampshire 
 Anna Christy Fall (1855–1930), lawyer
 Ivan Fisher, LLB, A prominent Manhattan lawyer
 Michael F. Flaherty, JD 1994, President of the Boston City Council
 James C. Foster JD 1976, is the chairman and chief executive officer of Charles River Laboratories, Inc.
 Frank H. Freedman, LLB 1949, LLM 1950, Senior Judge of the U.S. District Court for the District of Massachusetts
 Richard Graber, JD 1981, former United States Ambassador to the Czech Republic
 Judd A. Gregg, JD 1972, LLM 1975, U.S. Senator, Governor of New Hampshire 
 Mary Ann Greene, JD 1888
 Jeff Jacoby, JD 1983, Boston Globe opinion/editorial columnist
 Olin M. Jeffords, LLB 1918, LLD 1939, Chief Justice of the Vermont Supreme Court, father of Senator Jim Jeffords
 Stephen Douglas Johnson, LLM 1989, U.S. House Chief Counsel for Financial Institutions and Consumer Credit, 1995–98; White House Senior Advisor for the Office of Federal Housing Enterprise Oversight (OFHEO), 2000–03
 Clarence Benjamin Jones, LLB 1959, personal counsel, advisor, draft speech writer and close friend of Martin Luther King Jr.
 Dr. Barbara C. Jordan, LL.B. 1959, first African-American woman elected to the U.S. Congress from a southern state, awarded the Presidential Medal of Freedom in 1994, first woman to deliver a keynote address at the Democratic National Convention in 1976 
 David E. Kelley, JD 1983, Emmy winning television producer
 Takeo Kikuchi, LLB 1877, one of the first Japanese to study law in the US, founder and first president of Tokyo's Chuo University
 Rikki Klieman, JD, 1975, criminal defense lawyer and TV personality for truTV
 Gary F. Locke, JD 1975, United States Secretary of Commerce, Governor of Washington, and the first Asian-American governor in the mainland U.S. 
 Maria Lopez, first Hispanic appointed a judge in the Massachusetts, current television jurist on the U.S. syndicated television show Judge Maria Lopez.
 Sandra L. Lynch, JD 1971, first woman judge appointed to the U.S. Court of Appeals for the First Circuit
Frederick William Mansfield, LLB 1902, 46th Mayor of Boston, Massachusetts, and 38th Treasurer and Receiver-General of Massachusetts.
 Elizabeth (Sadie) Holloway Marston, LLB 1918 - co-creator of the comic book character Wonder Woman
 William C. Matthews, LLB 1907, played football and baseball for Harvard University; seen by many as the Jackie Robinson of his day
 J. Howard McGrath, LLB 1929, Sixtieth Attorney General, 1949-52 U.S. Senator, 1940–45Governor of Rhode Island. 
 Thomas McIntyre, JD, U.S. Senator (NH) 
Jordan Mintz, JD, Enron whistleblower
 F. Bradford Morse, LLB 1949, director of the United Nations Development Program
 Markos Moulitsas, JD 1999, founder of the blog Daily Kos
 Demetrius Newton, JD 1952, civil rights attorney
 Shannon O'Brien, JD 1985, first woman to hold the office of treasurer and receiver general of the Commonwealth of Massachusetts
 Joseph F. Quinn, LLB 1886, first Irishman appointed to the bench in Massachusetts, presided over the 1912 trial of Joseph Ettor and two other leaders of the Lawrence textile strike.
 Matt Rinaldi, JD 2001, attorney in Irving, Texas; Republican member of the Texas House of Representatives
 Dennis J. Roberts, 1930, Mayor of Providence and governor of Rhode Island
 William Russell, JD, Governor of Massachusetts 
 Sabita Singh, JD 1990, first judge of south Indian descent in the Commonwealth of Massachusetts.
 Robert T. Stafford, LLB 1938; HON 1959, U.S. Senator, father or the Stafford Loan program, the Stafford Disaster Relief and Emergency Assistance Act and co-sponsored the Wilderness Protection Act
 Charles Tetzlaff, LLB 1964, United States Attorney for the District of Vermont.
 Frank D. Thompson, LLB 1899; Associate Justice of the Vermont Supreme Court
 Ojetta Rogeriee Thompson, JD, Rhode Island Superior Court justice and judge on the United States Court of Appeals for the First Circuit
 Juan R. Torruella, JD 1957, first Hispanic to serve on the United States Court of Appeals for the First Circuit
 Robert Upton, JD, U.S. Senator (NH) 
 David I. Walsh, JD, U.S. Senator, Governor of Massachusetts 
 Clifton Reginald Wharton Sr., LLB 1920, first African-American Foreign Service Officer in the U.S. Department of State; the first black diplomat to become ambassador by rising through the ranks of the Foreign Service rather than by political appointment; and the first black diplomat to lead a U.S. delegation to a European country.
 Avon Williams, LLB 1947; LLM 1948, prominent civil rights attorney and Tennessee state senator
 Butler Roland Wilson, LLB 1883, co-founder of the Boston branch of the NAACP; branch president from 1926 to 1936; national board of directors in the 1920s.
 Steven M. Wise, JD 1976, founder of the Nonhuman Rights Project and former president of the Animal Legal Defense Fund
 Myrth York, JD 1972, Rhode Island State Senator, first female chair of the Senate Health, Education and Welfare Committee (RI)
 Owen D. Young, LLB 1896, founder of RCA, 1929 Time Magazine's Man of the Year Chairman and CEO of General Electric
 David Zaslav, CEO Discovery

References